Pavel Petřikov (born 1 July 1959) is a Czech judoka. He competed at the 1980, 1988 and the 1992 Summer Olympics. He is the father of Czech judoka Pavel Petřikov Jr.

References

External links
 

1959 births
Living people
Czech male judoka
Olympic judoka of Czechoslovakia
Judoka at the 1980 Summer Olympics
Judoka at the 1988 Summer Olympics
Judoka at the 1992 Summer Olympics
People from Slaný
Sportspeople from the Central Bohemian Region